DSPS may refer to:

 Defense Support Program Satellite, a system for detecting ballistic missile launch and nuclear warhead detonation.
 Delayed sleep phase disorder, a circadian rhythm disorder, formerly named DSPS
 Died without surviving issue,

See also 
 DSP (disambiguation)